In six-dimensional geometry, a rectified 6-orthoplex is a convex uniform 6-polytope, being a rectification of the regular 6-orthoplex.

There are unique 6 degrees of rectifications, the zeroth being the 6-orthoplex, and the 6th and last being the 6-cube. Vertices of the rectified 6-orthoplex are located at the edge-centers of the 6-orthoplex. Vertices of the birectified 6-orthoplex are located in the triangular face centers of the 6-orthoplex.

Rectified 6-orthoplex

The rectified 6-orthoplex is the vertex figure for the demihexeractic honeycomb.
 or

Alternate names
 rectified hexacross
 rectified hexacontitetrapeton (acronym: rag) (Jonathan Bowers)

Construction 
There are two Coxeter groups associated with the rectified hexacross, one with the C6 or [4,3,3,3,3] Coxeter group, and a lower symmetry with two copies of pentacross facets, alternating, with the D6 or [33,1,1] Coxeter group.

Cartesian coordinates 
Cartesian coordinates for the vertices of a rectified hexacross, centered at the origin, edge length  are all permutations of:
 (±1,±1,0,0,0,0)

Images

Root vectors 

The 60 vertices represent the root vectors of the simple Lie group D6. The vertices can be seen in 3 hyperplanes, with the 15 vertices rectified 5-simplices cells on opposite sides, and 30 vertices of an expanded 5-simplex passing through the center. When combined with the 12 vertices of the 6-orthoplex, these vertices represent the 72 root vectors of the B6 and C6 simple Lie groups.

Birectified 6-orthoplex

The birectified 6-orthoplex can tessellation space in the trirectified 6-cubic honeycomb.

Alternate names
 birectified hexacross
 birectified hexacontitetrapeton (acronym: brag) (Jonathan Bowers)

Cartesian coordinates 
Cartesian coordinates for the vertices of a rectified hexacross, centered at the origin, edge length  are all permutations of:
 (±1,±1,±1,0,0,0)

Images

It can also be projected into 3D-dimensions as  --> , a dodecahedron envelope.

Related polytopes 

These polytopes are a part a family of 63 Uniform 6-polytopes generated from the B6 Coxeter plane, including the regular 6-cube or 6-orthoplex.

Notes

References
 H.S.M. Coxeter: 
 H.S.M. Coxeter, Regular Polytopes, 3rd Edition, Dover New York, 1973 
 Kaleidoscopes: Selected Writings of H.S.M. Coxeter, edited by F. Arthur Sherk, Peter McMullen, Anthony C. Thompson, Asia Ivic Weiss, Wiley-Interscience Publication, 1995,  
 (Paper 22) H.S.M. Coxeter, Regular and Semi Regular Polytopes I, [Math. Zeit. 46 (1940) 380-407, MR 2,10]
 (Paper 23) H.S.M. Coxeter, Regular and Semi-Regular Polytopes II, [Math. Zeit. 188 (1985) 559-591]
 (Paper 24) H.S.M. Coxeter, Regular and Semi-Regular Polytopes III, [Math. Zeit. 200 (1988) 3-45]
 Norman Johnson Uniform Polytopes, Manuscript (1991)
 N.W. Johnson: The Theory of Uniform Polytopes and Honeycombs, Ph.D. 
   o3x3o3o3o4o - rag, o3o3x3o3o4o - brag

External links 
 Polytopes of Various Dimensions
 Multi-dimensional Glossary

6-polytopes